Sayed Askar Mousavi is a writer and novelist from Afghanistan. He is the author of The Hazaras of Afghanistan published on January 29, 2009 by Cambridge University.

Sayed Askar Mousavi was born in 1956 in a family belonging to the Hazara ethnic group in Karte Sakhi area of Kabul, Afghanistan

He was educated at the University of East Anglia (BA Development Studies, 1987) and St Antony's College, Oxford (MLitt; Ph.D.). Sayed Askar Mousavi was a prominent figure in the "cultural struggle" of the Afghan Mujahideen in Iran during the Russian occupation. He was the main writer and editor of a few publications, including Saaf, and Jawali.

See also 
 List of Hazara people

References 

Living people
1956 births
Hazara writers
Hazara historians
Hazara people
People from Kabul
Alumni of the University of East Anglia
Alumni of St Antony's College, Oxford